Louis Burnier (1795–1873) was a Swiss pastor and author of educational and religious works. He was pastor at Lutry, Lucens, Cossonay, Vich, Rolle and Morges.

Works
 Études Élémentaires Et Progressives de la Parole de Dieu (Lausanne, 1847–1852) 9 vols.
 Histoire littéraire de l'Education morale et religieuse en France et dans la Suisse romande

References

1795 births
1873 deaths
Swiss writers
Waldensians